Sri Jaya or Kampung Baru Sri Jaya is a Hockchew-majority new village in Maran District, Pahang, Malaysia, about 63 km from Kuantan. It is accessible through the East Coast Expressway at Exit 827. Sri Jaya is the entrance point to Tasik Chini and Berkelah falls.

References

Maran District
Villages in Pahang